Bluem of Youth is a Japanese pop group which achieved greatest success in the late 1990s after it was the subject of a reality television series called Susunu! Denpa Shōnen.  The name is a mix of "bloom of youth" and "blue". Its members are Yuji Bessho (別所悠二) and Hiroyuki Matsugashita (松ヶ下宏之). They went on permanent hiatus on New Year's Eve of 2002, but played a 10th anniversary concert commemorating their debut in 2005.

Travels in Russia
The duo traveled across Russia by Trans-Siberian Railway for seven months from March to October 1999, for a Japanese television program called Susunu! Denpa Shōnen. Their career was at a crossroads due to poor sales and their contract with their record label was not renewed.

Therefore, they were given a challenge by the producers of Denpa Shōnen.  The two were taken to Moscow by the program's staff. They were told to travel from Moscow to Vladivostok via the Trans-Siberian Railway while earning their living by only playing street concerts. They then had to compose a good song by the end of their travels and gather 10,000 or more people for a concert in the Nippon Budokan on 4 October 1999. If they could not do this, then they had to quit their careers as musicians and break up.

Finally, they composed the song "Last Tour" on the bank of Amur River and played the song at the Budokan. They were able to gather more than the required 10,000 people. The concert was going to be done only once, but there was an encore performance because it was a huge success.

In 2000, they released Subasība (СПАСИБО) album, which collected songs composed in Russia. "Supasiba" is a Japanized word for "Спасибо" which means "Thank you" in Russian language. "Stairway" which was released next to "Last Tour" was composed in Russia, too.

In 2003, they were invited to the "Japan Festival in Moscow" at the Malyi Theatre.

Russia is like a home away from home for them now, and they have been there frequently for private travel.

Discography

Singles
 Saigo no Negai (10 October 1995)
 10 Calls After (13 December 1995)
 TRUTH (1 July 1996)
 Time goes by ... Kimi ga Irudake de / Senrozoi no Koi' (1 October 1997)
 Garden (21 March 1998)
 Russian Roulette (20 June 1998)
 Koe (2 December 1998)
 Last Tour ~Yakusoku no Basho e~ (1 December 1999)
 Stairway (23 February 2000)
 Lover's slit (2 August 2000)
 If (12 October 2000)
 Yudachi -sound of the memory- (8 August 2001)
 Saruveju (9 October 2002)
 Hitohira no Yume (4 December 2002)

Albums
 bloom of youth (1 February 1996)
 Target (1 July 1998)
 Supasība (Спасибо, en: Thank you) (15 March 2000)
 Early Singles+ (19 April 2000)
 Fuyu no Shizuku (5 December 2001)
 Gift -Bluem of Extra- (27 March 2002)
 GROWIN' DAYS (18 December 2002)
 20021228 LIVE COMPLETE (23 April 2003)

DVD
 Supasība Tour 2000 (23 August 2000)
 12 Clips+ (28 March 2001)
 Ichiya Ensōkai -classical premium- (18 December 2002)
 GROWIN' DAYS CLIPS +'' (19 February 2003)

References

External links
 B.O.Y's PAGE

Japanese pop music groups
Sony Music Entertainment Japan artists
Musical groups from Hiroshima Prefecture